Blaise Mamoum (born 25 December 1979) is a Cameroonian former professional footballer who played as a forward.

Career
Mamoum was born in Bamenda, Cameroon. After making one appearance for French Division 2 side Saint-Étienne, Mamoum signed for English outfit Scunthorpe United but soon left due to not liking it there.

For the 2000–01 season, he signed for Werder Bremen in the Bundesliga and made one appearance, in a 3–0 loss to Bayern Munich, before joining Waldhof Mannheim in the second division, where he made 13 league appearances.

In 2003, Mamoum signed for Bundesliga team Hamburger SV, but again did not make a league appearance and eventually returned to France because of injury, where he played in the lower leagues with Andrézieux-Bouthéon as well as FCO Firminy Insersport.

References

Living people
People from Bamenda
1979 births
Cameroonian footballers
Association football forwards
Ligue 2 players
2. Bundesliga players
AS Saint-Étienne players
Scunthorpe United F.C. players
SV Werder Bremen II players
SV Waldhof Mannheim players
Hamburger SV II players
Cameroonian expatriate footballers
Cameroonian expatriate sportspeople in France
Expatriate footballers in France
Cameroonian expatriate sportspeople in England
Expatriate footballers in England
Cameroonian expatriate sportspeople in Germany
Expatriate footballers in Germany